Cao Exiu (fl. 1290), was a Chinese actress and poet.

She was famous in contemporary China for her ability as a Zajuactress and referred to by Gao Andao as one of the elite artists of that profession. She was also a published poet. She was described as witty beauty with an elegant behavior, and was respected for her education within history and the classics. There are several stories about her.

References 
 Lily Xiao Hong Lee, Sue Wiles: Biographical Dictionary of Chinese Women, Volume II: Tang Through Ming 618 - 1644

13th-century Chinese people
13th-century Chinese women
13th-century Chinese actresses
13th-century Chinese poets
Yuan dynasty actors